The 1970 North Rhine-Westphalia state election was held on 14 June 1970 to elect the 7th Landtag of North Rhine-Westphalia. The outgoing government was a coalition of the Social Democratic Party (SPD) and Free Democratic Party (FDP) led by Minister-President Heinz Kühn.

The opposition Christian Democratic Union (CDU) returned as the largest party after falling to second in 1966, winning a narrow plurality of 46.3%, with a lead of 0.2% and one seat over the SPD. The FDP suffered losses and declined to 5.5%. Overall, the incumbent coalition retained a reduced majority of 105 seats. However, a number of FDP deputies opposed to cooperation with the SPD refused to vote for Kühn in the investiture vote on 28 July; he was re-elected with the minimum majority of 101 votes out of 200. There were 95 votes for CDU leader Heinrich Köppler and four abstentions. In October, three members of the FDP faction defected to the new party National Liberal Action, leaving the government with a narrow majority of 102 seats. Nonetheless, it completed its full term.

Electoral system
The Landtag was elected via mixed-member proportional representation. 150 members were elected in single-member constituencies via first-past-the-post voting, and fifty then allocated using compensatory proportional representation. A single ballot was used for both. An electoral threshold of 5% of valid votes is applied to the Landtag; parties that fall below this threshold are ineligible to receive seats.

Background

In the previous election held on 10 July 1966, the SPD became the largest party for the first time in the state, coming just short of a majority with 49.5% and 99 seats. The CDU was reduced to second place with 43%, and the FDP improved to 7.4%. The incumbent CDU–FDP coalition was renewed, but collapsed in November after a grand coalition took power federally. The FDP subsequently agreed to a coalition with the SPD, and Heinz Kühn was elected Minister-President by the Landtag.

Parties
The table below lists parties represented in the 6th Landtag of North Rhine-Westphalia.

Results

External links

References

Elections in North Rhine-Westphalia